Then There Were Three may refer to:

 Then There Were Three (film), a 1961 Italian war movie
 A first season episode of Hawaiian Eye

See also
 ...And Then There Were Three..., a 1978 studio album by the English rock band Genesis